Christopher Fleming MD FRCSI (14 July 1800 – 30 December 1880) was an Irish surgeon.

Life
He was born at Boardstown in County Westmeath on 14 July 1800, and in 1821 graduated B.A. in the University of Dublin. 
He became a licentiate of the Royal College of Surgeons in Ireland (RCSI) in 1824, and a member in 1826. 
In 1838, he took an M.D. degree in the University of Dublin, but did not obtain a hospital appointment until 1851, when he became surgeon to the House of Industry Hospitals. 

In 1856, he was elected President of the Royal College of Surgeons in Ireland, and in 1877 collected some papers which he had previously published in medical journals into a volume entitled Clinical Records of Injuries and Diseases of the Genito-Urinary Organs. 
His only other work is "Remarks on the Application of Chloroform to Surgical purposes", Dublin, 1851, and both are without permanent value.  

He married a Miss Radcliff, and had seven children, of whom a son and a daughter survived him. He retired from practice a few years before his death, and went to live at Donnybrook, near Dublin, where he died 30 December 1880.

Notes

References

Attribution
; Endnotes:
Sir A. Cameron's Hist. of the Royal College of Surgeons in Ireland
British Medical Journal, 8 January 1881
Index Catalogue of Library of the Surgeon-General's Office, U.S. Army.

1800 births
1880 deaths
Irish surgeons
People from County Westmeath
Presidents of the Royal College of Surgeons in Ireland